Michael Chadbourne Mills (born March 20, 1966) is an American film and music video director, writer and graphic designer. He is best known for his independent films, Beginners (2010), 20th Century Women (2016), and C'mon, C'mon (2021). Mills received an Academy Award for Best Original Screenplay nomination for 20th Century Women.

Early life and education
Michael Chadbourne Mills was born in Berkeley, California, the son of Paul Chadbourne Mills, an art historian and museum director, and Janet L. Dowd, a draftsperson.

He graduated from Cooper Union in Lower Manhattan, New York City.

Career
Mike Mills has created music videos for acts including Moby, Yoko Ono and Air. Air named the fifth song on their album Talkie Walkie after Mills.

He has also worked as a graphic designer on promotional material and album covers for such acts as Beastie Boys, Beck, Sonic Youth, They Might Be Giants, and Ol' Dirty Bastard. In addition he has created graphics for X-Girl, Marc Jacobs, and produces his own line of posters and fabrics called Humans by Mike Mills.

Mills played guitar and performed background vocals with the short-lived indie rock band Butter 08 along with Yuka Honda and Miho Hatori of Cibo Matto, Russell Simins of the Jon Spencer Blues Explosion, and Rick Lee of Skeleton Key. The band released one self-titled album in 1996 on the now defunct Grand Royal record label.

Thumbsucker (2005) was his feature-film directorial debut, for which he also created the film posters. In 2007, Mills filmed the feature-length documentary Does Your Soul Have A Cold?, which explored the issues around the introduction of anti-depressants to Japanese culture. The film premiered at SXSW Festival and was part of IFC's documentary film series. He followed this up with Beginners in 2010.

His next feature film was 20th Century Women, starring Annette Bening, Greta Gerwig, Elle Fanning and Billy Crudup. The film had its world premiere at the New York Film Festival, and was released on December 28, 2016, by A24.

He has released some of his art/documentary photography works with the two books, Gas Book 11 (2003) and Humans (2006). In 2009, the Berlin-based culture magazine 032c devoted an issue to Mills. For the occasion Mills was interviewed by Nick Currie, best known for his work as Momus, in a piece called "Getting Through the New Depression".

In 2019, he directed the short film I Am Easy to Find starring Alicia Vikander, which accompanied the album of the same name by The National.

Mills' latest directorial feature film starring Joaquin Phoenix, titled C'mon C'mon, had its world premiere on 2 September 2021 at Telluride Film Festival.

Personal life 
Mills' mother died of brain cancer in 1999. Six months after she died, his father Paul came out as gay at the age of 75 and after 45 years of marriage. Five years later, his father died of cancer.

Mills is married to fellow artist and film director Miranda July, with whom he has a child, born in February 2012.

Awards and nominations

Filmography

Films

Documentary film
(Air): Eating Sleeping Waiting & Playing (1999)
Does Your Soul Have A Cold? (2007)

Short films

Music videos

Other works

Record sleeves

 "Kelly Watch the Stars" single – Air
 "Moon Safari" – Air
 "Playground Love" single – Air
 "Sexy Boy" single – Air
 "The Virgin Suicides" soundtrack – Air
 "Root Down" EP – Beastie Boys
 "Hot Sauce Committee Part Two" – Beastie Boys
 "Boss Hog" – Boss Hog
 "Socks, Drugs, and Rock and Roll" – Buffalo Daughter
 "Butter 08" – Butter 08
 "Viva! La Woman" – Cibo Matto
 "Runaway" single – Deee-Lite
 "Thank You Everyday" single – Deee-Lite
 "Infinity Within" – Deee-Lite
 "I Had a Dream I Was Falling Through a Hole in the Ozone Layer" single – Deee-Lite
 "Figure 8" promo – Elliott Smith
 "Experimental Remixes" – Jon Spencer Blues Explosion
 "Shimmy Shimmy Ya" single – Ol' Dirty Bastard
 "Tone Dialing" – Ornette Coleman & Prime Time
 "Junta" – Phish
 "A Picture of Nectar" – Phish
 "Rift" – Phish
 "Promise Me Nothing" – Repercussions
 "Logan's Sanctuary" – Roger Joseph Manning Jr. & Brian Reitzell
 "Lose Control" – Silk
 "No Cities to Love" – Sleater-Kinney
 "Washing Machine" – Sonic Youth
 "The Diamond Sea" single – Sonic Youth
 "Little Trouble Girl" single – Sonic Youth
 "Superfriends" – Sweet Water
 "Back to Skull" – They Might Be Giants
 "John Henry" – They Might Be Giants
 "Thumbsucker" soundtrack – Tim DeLaughter & The Polyphonic Spree
 "Wild Flag" – Wild Flag
 "Future Crimes" b/w "Glass Tambourine" single – Wild Flag

Commercials

 Adidas "Forever Sport"
 Apple Computer
 CareerBuilder "Self Help Yourself"
 Cisco "Tomorrow"
Clos19 "Bring Them In"
 DuPont
 Facebook "Our Friends Manifesto"
 Facebook "Friend Request"
 Gap "Cool"
 Gap "Mambo"
 Mastercard
 Nike
 Old Spice "Fiji"
Saturn "Numbers"
Tempur-Pedic "Bear"
Tempur-Pedic "Cloud"
 Volkswagen "Tree"
 Volkswagen "Bubble Boy"

Bibliography
 Gas Book 11 (2003)
 Thumbsucker (2005)
 Humans (2006)
 Fireworks (2008)
 Graphics Films (2009)
 Drawings From the Film Beginners (2011)

References

External links
 
 
 Mike Mills' blog (last updated 2005)

American music video directors
Cooper Union alumni
Living people
Artists from Berkeley, California
American graphic designers
Film directors from California
American male screenwriters
Screenwriters from California
Advertising directors
Year of birth missing (living people)